John Carroll Williams (born June 12, 1962) is the president and chief executive officer of the Federal Reserve Bank of New York, having also served as president of Federal Reserve Bank of San Francisco from 2011 to 2018. He is currently serving as vice chairman of the Federal Open Market Committee.

Education
Williams earned an A.B. with high distinction from the University of California at Berkeley in 1984; a Master of Science with distinction in economics from the London School of Economics in 1989, and completed a Ph.D. in economics at Stanford University in 1994.

Career
Williams began his career in 1994 as an economist at the Board of Governors of the Federal Reserve System. He joined the Federal Reserve Bank of San Francisco in 2002. Prior to becoming the president, he was the executive vice president and director of research for the San Francisco bank. He took office as president and chief executive officer of the Federal Reserve Bank of San Francisco on March 1, 2011.

On April 3, 2018, it was announced that Williams had been named president and CEO of the New York Fed, beginning June 18, 2018.  Since taking up this job, Williams has given numerous speeches about both domestic and international economic issues.  One subject that he has often referred to is that of the long-term equilibrium rate of interest, frequently referred to as the 'natural rate of interest'.  He has even lightheartedly said that he "has a passion for r-star".

Other
Williams currently serves as the managing editor of the International Journal of Central Banking. Previously, he served as associate editor of The American Economic Review. Additionally, he served as senior economist at the White House Council of Economic Advisers and as a lecturer at Stanford University's Graduate School of Business.

Personal life
Williams is a native of Sacramento, California.  He is married to Audrey Lyndon, professor of nursing and medicine and assistant dean for clinical research at the Rory Meyers College of Nursing, New York University. They have two sons and reside in New York City.

References

External links
 Biography at FederalReserve.org
 Speeches by John C. Williams at Federal Reserve Bank of San Francisco

|-

1962 births
Living people
Alumni of the London School of Economics
Federal Reserve Bank of New York presidents
Federal Reserve Bank of San Francisco presidents
Federal Reserve economists
People from the San Francisco Bay Area
Stanford University Graduate School of Business faculty
Stanford University School of Humanities and Sciences alumni
University of California, Berkeley alumni